Asia is a 2020 Israeli drama film directed by Ruthy Pribar, starring Alena Yiv and Shira Haas. The film was premiered online at the 2020 Tribeca Film Festival (due to the COVID-19 pandemic), where it won the awards for Best Actress (Shira Haas), Best Cinematography (Daniella Nowitz) as well as the Nora Ephron Prize (Ruthy Pribar). After winning Best Picture at the 30th Israeli Academy Awards (Ophir Awards), it was automatically submitted as the Israeli entry for the Best International Feature Film at the 93rd Academy Awards, but it was not nominated. The film won eight additional Israeli Academy Awards (Ophir Awards) out of a total twelve nominations, including both Best Leading Actress and Best Supporting Actress. Menemsha Films gained North American distribution rights to the film in June 2020, and announced its theatrical premiere at Film Forum in New York City in 2020.

Premise 
Asia is a mother-daughter drama film. A thirty-five year old single mother named Asia immigrated to Jerusalem from Russia with her daughter Vika, where she works as a nurse at a hospital. IndieWire wrote:

Cast 

 Alena Yiv as Asia
 Shira Haas as Vika
 Tamir Mula as Gabi
  as Stas
 Eden Halili as Natalie
 Or Barak as Roy
 Nadia Tichonova as Valentina
 Mirna Fridman as Rose
 Tatiana Machlinovski as Lena
 Evgeny Tarlatzky as Boris

Production 
Filming for Asia took place in late 2018. The film was edited by Neta Dvorkis and produced by Yoav Roeh and Aurit Zamir with casting direction by Esther Kling, the same director who assigned Shira Haas with her award-winning debut role in Princess (2014).

Release
Asia premiered online at the 2020 Tribeca Film Festival, which could not take place physically due to the COVID-19 pandemic. The film is spoken in Hebrew and Russian with English subtitles. The movie had its first screening on 17 April 2020

Reception

Critical response 
The site's critical consensus reads, "An intelligent and touching portrait of a family at odds, Asia is an auspicious feature directorial debut for writer-director Ruthy Pribar." Eric John of IndieWire described the film as "A modest, intimate mother-daughter drama with one of the most wrenching finales in recent memory." David Rooney of The Hollywood Reporter wrote "Ruthy Pribar makes an assured feature debut, balancing sobriety with emotional intensity in Asia"

Accolades 
After premiering at the Tribeca Film Festival, the film won 3 awards: Best International Actress for Shira Haas, Best Cinematography for Daniella Nowitz and the Nora Ephron Prize for Ruthy Pribar. The latter is a $25,000 prize awarded to a female writer or filmmaker "with a distinctive voice". The jury of the festival ( Danny Boyle, William Hurt) wrote about Haas: "Her face is a never-ending landscape in which even the tiniest expression is heartbreaking; she’s an incredibly honest and present actress who brings depth to everything she does." After winning Best Picture at the 30th Israeli Academy Awards (Ophir Awards),  it was automatically selected as the Israeli entry for consideration for Best International Feature Film at the 93rd Academy Awards.

See also
 List of submissions to the 93rd Academy Awards for Best International Feature Film
 List of Israeli submissions for the Academy Award for Best International Feature Film

References

External links 
 
 
 
 

2020 drama films
2020 films
Films not released in theaters due to the COVID-19 pandemic
Israeli drama films
2020s Hebrew-language films
2020s Russian-language films
Films shot in Israel
Films set in Jerusalem
2020 multilingual films
Israeli multilingual films
Films about immigration
Films about families